FC Eintracht Bamberg is a German association football club from the city of Bamberg, Bavaria. The footballers are part of a sports club formed on 1 April 2006 out of the union of 1. FC Bamberg and TSV Eintracht Bamberg. With over 1,500 members it is one of the largest sports associations in the Upper Franconia region of the state and has departments for bowling, karate, gymnastics, table tennis, tennis, and volleyball.

History
The two founding clubs initially held discussions around the possibility of a merger in the summer of 2005, but the talks failed when the proposal did not receive the necessary three-quarters majority support of the membership of TSV Eintracht. In January 2006, after another half-year of discussion and lobbying, Eintrachts membership overwhelmingly agreed to the merger, while the membership of FC Bamberg followed suit in March.

The newly merged side took up the place of FC in the Bayernliga (IV) and earned an unexpectedly good 5th place result. In the following season, the club stayed on course for a top-four finish, which would have meant Regionalliga Süd qualification, for most of the season but failed in the end, finishing fifth again. However, the insolvency of the Sportfreunde Siegen and the fact that the SpVgg Bayreuth was refused a licence meant, Bamberg did still move up to the Regionalliga.Aufstieg Regionalliga Süd (in German) Weltfussball.de, accessed: 13 June 2008

The club finished in mid-table in the 2008–09 Regionalliga season. The club had to declare insolvency at the end of the 2009–10 season and folded. However, a new club was formed immediately under the name of FC Eintracht Bamberg 2010 and entered the Bayernliga for 2010–11.

At the end of the 2011–12 season the club managed to finish in the top nine of the Bayernliga and thereby directly qualified for the new tier four Regionalliga Bayern. In this league the club finished 13th and 10th in its first two seasons there. The team came last in the league in 2014–15 and was relegated from the Regionalliga to the Bayernliga where it came last once more in the following season and was relegated to the Landesliga. The club had to declare insolvency once more in March 2016.

Stadium
1. FC Eintracht Bamberg plays in the Fuchs-Park-Stadion (previously Hauptkampfbahn im Volkspark) which served as the home ground of FC prior to the merger. The stadium was opened in 1926 and expanded in 1938 to accommodate 22,600 spectators. The record attendance of 27,000 was established in an amateur contest between Germany and France (1:1) on 2 May 1964.

Honours
The club's honours:

League
1. FC Eintracht Bamberg
 Amateurliga Bayern (III)
 Champions: 1946, 1948 (N), 1950, 1957 (N), 1958 (N), 1963 (N)
 Runners-up: 1961 (N)
 Landesliga Bayern-Nord (IV)
 Champions: 1975, 1981
 Runners-up: 2004, 2006
 Bezirksoberliga Oberfranken (V-VI)
 Champions: 2008‡
 Runners-up: 1992, 1997
 (N) = Northern division

Eintracht Bamberg
 Landesliga Bayern-Nordost (VI)
 Champions: 2019
 Bezirksliga Oberfranken West (VII)
 Champions: 2018‡

Cup
 Oberfranken Cup Winners: 2002

Youth
 Bavarian Under 19 championship Runners-up: 2006
 Bavarian Under 17 championship'
 Runners-up: 2004
 ‡ Reserve team

Recent managers
Recent managers of the club:

Recent seasons
The recent season-by-season performance of the club:

1. FC Bamberg
The final placings of 1. FC Bamberg:

Eintracht Bamberg

Reserve team

With the introduction of the Bezirksoberligas in 1988 as the new fifth tier, below the Landesligas, all leagues below dropped one tier. With the introduction of the Regionalligas in 1994 and the 3. Liga in 2008 as the new third tier, below the 2. Bundesliga, all leagues below dropped one tier. With the establishment of the Regionalliga Bayern as the new fourth tier in Bavaria in 2012 the Bayernliga was split into a northern and a southern division, the number of Landesligas expanded from three to five and the Bezirksoberligas abolished. All leagues from the Bezirksligas onwards were elevated one tier.

References

External links
Official website
 FC Eintracht Bamberg on Weltfussball.de

 
Association football clubs established in 2006
Association football clubs disestablished in 2010
Association football clubs established in 2010
Bamberg
Football in Upper Franconia
2006 establishments in Germany
2010 disestablishments in Germany
2010 establishments in Germany